The Latur–Miraj section of the Indian Railways is a  link from Latur to Miraj. It falls under the administration of the Solapur railway division of Central Railway zone of Indian Railways.

The Barsi Light Railway on the route with a track gauge of  opened in 1897. It was converted to metre-gauge  between 1929 and 1931 as part of the Great Indian Peninsula Railway. The section was converted from metre gauge to broad gauge in 2007–2008. It was electrified in 2014.

References

5 ft 6 in gauge railways in India